Wil is a Swiss city. Wil or WIL may also refer to:

Places in Switzerland
Wil, a city in the canton of St. Gallen
Wil (Wahlkreis), a district which contains the city
Wil, Aargau, a village in the canton of Aargau
Wil, Nidwalden, a settlement in the canton of Nidwalden
Wil, Zurich, a municipality in the canton of Zurich

Transportation
West Island line of Hong Kong
WIL, Amtrak code for Wilmington station (Delaware)
WIL, National Rail code for Willington railway station, Derbyshire
WIL, IATA code for Wilson Airport, Kenya

Radio stations
WIL-FM, an FM radio station in St. Louis, Missouri
KZQZ, an AM radio station in St. Louis, Missouri formerly known as WIL (AM)

Acronyms
Webel Informatics Limited, of West Bengal, India
Western International League, a North American baseball league of the early 20th century
Work integrated learning, a method of theoretical and practical learning
Workers International League (disambiguation), several socialist organisations

Other uses
Will (given name), a list of people and fictional characters named Will or Wil
Wil, an abbreviation of the Dutch feminine given name Willeke
FC Wil, a football club based in the city of Wil
 Wiltshire, county in England, Chapman code